is a passenger railway station located in the city of  Matsusaka,  Mie Prefecture, Japan, operated by the private railway operator Kintetsu Railway.

Lines
Kushida Station is served by the Yamada Line, and is located 13.9 rail kilometers from the terminus of the line at Ise-Nakagawa Station.

Station layout
The station consists of two side platforms and four tracks. Local trains use side tracks (Tracks 1 and 4). Through trains which do not stop at this station use center tracks (Tracks 2 and 3).. The station is staffed.

Platforms

Adjacent stations

History
Kushida Station opened on March 27, 1930 as a station on the Sangu Kyuko Electric Railway. On March 15, 1941, the line merged with Osaka Electric Railway to become a station on Kansai Kyuko Railway's Yamada Line. This line in turn was merged with the Nankai Electric Railway on June 1, 1944 to form Kintetsu. A new station building was completed in March 1992.

Passenger statistics
In fiscal 2019, the station was used by an average of 672 passengers daily (boarding passengers only).

Surrounding area
Kushida River
Kushida Shrine
Mie Prefectural Matsusaka Commercial High School

See also
List of railway stations in Japan

References

External links

 Kintetsu: Kushida Station

Railway stations in Japan opened in 1930
Railway stations in Mie Prefecture
Stations of Kintetsu Railway
Matsusaka, Mie